Chrysoula Tsogka is a Greek applied mathematician whose research involves remote sensing, wave propagation, and imaging through complex media.  She is a professor of applied mathematics at the University of California, Merced.

Education
Tsogka studied chemical engineering at the National Technical University of Athens, graduating with a bachelor's degree in 1995. She went to Paris Dauphine University for graduate study in applied mathematics, earning a master's degree in 1996 and completing her Ph.D. in 1999. Her dissertation, Mathematical and Numerical Modeling of 3D Elastic Wave Propagation in Complex Media with Cracks, was supervised by Patrick Joly.

Career
After working as a researcher for CNRS in the Laboratoire de Mecanique et d’Acoustique, and as a visiting researcher at Stanford University, she became an assistant professor at the University of Chicago in 2004. She moved to the University of Crete as an associate professor in 2007, and was promoted to full professor in 2014. She took her present position at the University of California, Merced in 2019.

References

External links
Home page

Year of birth missing (living people)
Living people
Greek mathematicians
Greek women mathematicians
Applied mathematicians
National Technical University of Athens alumni
University of Chicago faculty
Academic staff of the University of Crete
University of California, Merced faculty